CJMK-FM is a radio station serving Saskatoon, Saskatchewan. Owned by 629112 Saskatchewan Ltd. trading as Saskatoon Media Group and broadcasting on 98.3 FM, the station broadcasts a classic hits format branded as "98 Cool FM".

History
The station received approval in 2000  and CJMK was launched in 2001 by Hildebrand Communications as Magic 98.3.

On January 17, 2014 the station flipped from hot adult contemporary to classic hits, branded as "98 Cool FM".

References

External links
98 Cool FM

JMK
JMK
Radio stations established in 2001
2001 establishments in Saskatchewan